Ouse Bridge may refer to:

 Ouse Bridge, York, a historic bridge in the centre of the city of York, England
 Ouse Bridge (M62), a bridge carrying the M62 motorway over the River Ouse near Goole, England
 Ouse Bridge railway station, a short-lived railway station in Norfolk, England

See also

 Ouse (disambiguation)